E Ring or E-ring may refer to:

A ring of Saturn
 E-Ring, a television series
 The outer ring of The Pentagon, occupied by the most senior officers and their planning staffs
 A specific type of retaining ring, named after its rounded "E" shape